Tallinn Art Hall is an art gallery built in 1934 by Edgar Johan Kuusik on Freedom Square in Tallinn, Estonia.

It is known for its exhibitions of modern art, held in the gallery itself as well as the locations Tallinn Art Hall Gallery and Tallinn City Gallery.

The original building was modified by adding an additional story in the 1960s. Perhaps this is what caused the crack in the facade visible near one of the two decorative sculptures of Work and Beauty by the sculptor .

References

External links

1934 establishments in Estonia
Art galleries established in 1934
Buildings and structures in Tallinn
Culture in Tallinn
Tourist attractions in Tallinn
Art museums and galleries in Estonia
Modern art museums